Boletellus dissiliens is a species of fungus in the family Boletaceae. Found in Singapore, it was originally described as Boletus dissiliens by E.J.H. Corner in 1972, and transferred to Boletellus in 1981.

References

Fungi described in 1972
Fungi of Asia
dissiliens